Malvern station or Malverne station may refer to:
East Malvern railway station, in Melbourne, Australia
Malvern railway station, Melbourne, in Australia
Malvern tram depot, in Melbourne, Australia
Great Malvern railway station, a station in Malvern, England
Malvern Link railway station, a station in Malvern, England
Malvern station (Arkansas), an Amtrak station in Malvern, Arkansas, U.S.
Malverne (LIRR station), a Long Island Rail Road station in Malverne, New York, U.S.
Malvern station (SEPTA), a SEPTA station in Malvern, Pennsylvania, U.S.
Malvern Loop station, a trolley station in Philadelphia, Pennsylvania, U.S

See also
Malvern (disambiguation)